Twen was a West German magazine that was published from 1959 to 1971, and known for its innovative design and typography.

History and profile
Twen was launched in 1959 as a bimonthly magazine and the first issue appeared in April 1959. The founders were Hans A. Nikel and Hans Hermann. However, there is another report citing the founders as Adolf Theobald and Stephen Wolf. 

In September 1961, the magazine became a monthly publication. Willy Fleckhaus was Twen'''s art director throughout its existence. Notable photographers included Christa Peters. Twen was pitched at "people in their twenties, from 15 to 30", thus its name, Twen''. It was read in both West and East Germany. The magazine folded with the June 1971 issue.

References

1959 establishments in West Germany
1971 disestablishments in West Germany
Bi-monthly magazines published in Germany
Defunct magazines published in Germany
German-language magazines
Monthly magazines published in Germany
Magazines established in 1959
Magazines disestablished in 1971
Visual arts magazines published in Germany
Teen magazines